Tabalong Regency is one of the regencies in the Indonesian province of South Kalimantan, on Borneo island. It has an area of 3,766.97 km2, and had a population at the 2010 Census of 218,620 and 253,305 at the 2020 Census; the official estimate as at mid 2021 was 256,903. The administrative capital is the town of Tanjung. Motto: "Saraba Kawa" (Banjarese).

Administrative division 
The Regency is divided into twelve districts, tabulated below with their areas and population totals from the 2010 Census and the 2020 Census, together with the official estimates for mid 2021. The table also includes the locations of the district administrative centres, the number of administrative villages (rural desa and urban kelurahan) in each district, and its postal codes.

Notes: (a) except the village of Sungai Durian (postcode of 72167). (a) except the town of Tanjung (postcode of 71513) and the villages of Jangkung (postcode of 71512) and Agung (postcode of 71514).

References

External links 

 

Regencies of South Kalimantan